James Bond is a fictional character created by British novelist Ian Fleming in 1953. A British secret agent working for MI6 under the codename 007, Bond has been portrayed on film in twenty-seven productions by actors Sean Connery, David Niven, George Lazenby, Roger Moore, Timothy Dalton, Pierce Brosnan and Daniel Craig. Eon Productions, which now holds the adaptation rights to all of Fleming's Bond novels, made all but two films in the film series.

In 1961, producers Albert R. Broccoli and Harry Saltzman purchased the filming rights to Fleming's novels. They founded Eon Productions and, with financial backing by United Artists, produced Dr. No, directed by Terence Young and featuring Connery as Bond. Following its release in 1962, Broccoli and Saltzman created the holding company Danjaq to ensure future productions in the James Bond film series. The Eon series currently has twenty-five films, with the most recent, No Time to Die, released in September 2021. With a combined gross of $7.8 billion to date, it is the fifth-highest-grossing film series in nominal terms. Adjusting for inflation, the series has earned over $19.2 billion in 2022 dollars from box-office receipts alone, with non-Eon entries pushing this inflation-adjusted figure to a grand total in excess of $20 billion.

The films have won six Academy Awards: for Sound Effects (now Sound Editing) in Goldfinger (at the 37th Awards), to John Stears for Visual Effects in Thunderball (at the 38th Awards), to Per Hallberg and Karen Baker Landers for Sound Editing, to Adele and Paul Epworth for Original Song in Skyfall (at the 85th Awards), to Sam Smith and Jimmy Napes for Original Song in Spectre (at the 88th Awards), and to Billie Eilish and Finneas O'Connell for Original Song in No Time to Die (at the 94th Awards). Several other songs produced for the films have been nominated for Academy Awards for Original Song, including Paul McCartney's "Live and Let Die", Carly Simon's "Nobody Does It Better", and Sheena Easton's "For Your Eyes Only". In 1982, Albert R. Broccoli received the Irving G. Thalberg Memorial Award.

When Broccoli and Saltzman bought the rights to existing and future Fleming titles, the deal did not include Casino Royale, which had been sold to producer Gregory Ratoff for a television adaptation in 1954. After Ratoff's death, the rights passed to Charles K. Feldman, who subsequently produced the Bond spoof Casino Royale in 1967. A legal case ensured that the film rights to the novel Thunderball were held by Kevin McClory, as he, Fleming and scriptwriter Jack Whittingham had written a film script on which the novel was based. Although Eon Productions and McClory joined forces to produce Thunderball, McClory still retained the rights to the story and adapted Thunderball into 1983's non-Eon entry, Never Say Never Again. Distribution rights to both of those films are currently held by Metro-Goldwyn-Mayer Pictures, which distributes Eon's regular series.

Eon films

Dr. No (1962) 

Strangways, the British Intelligence (SIS) Station Chief in Jamaica, is killed. In response, British agent James Bond—also known as 007—is sent to Jamaica to investigate the circumstances. During his investigation Bond meets Quarrel, a Cayman fisherman, who had been working with Strangways around the nearby islands to collect mineral samples. One of the islands was Crab Key, home to the reclusive Dr. No.

Bond visits the island, where he meets a local shell diver, Honey Ryder. The three are attacked by No's men, who kill Quarrel using a flamethrowing armoured tractor; Bond and Honey are taken prisoner. Dr. No informs them he is a member of SPECTRE, the Special Executive for Counter-intelligence, Terrorism, Revenge and Extortion, and he plans to disrupt the Project Mercury space launch from Cape Canaveral with his atomic-powered radio beam. Bond and Honey escape from the island, killing No and blowing up his compound in the process.

From Russia with Love (1963) 

SPECTRE's expert planner Kronsteen, known as "Number Five", upon order of the organisation's Number One, devises a plot to steal a Lektor cryptographic device from the Soviets and sell it back to them while exacting revenge on Bond for killing their agent Dr. No; ex-SMERSH operative Rosa Klebb, SPECTRE's Number Three, is in charge of the mission. She recruits Donald "Red" Grant as an assassin and Tatiana Romanova, a cipher clerk at the Soviet consulate in Istanbul, as the unwitting bait.

Bond travels to Turkey and meets Ali Kerim Bey, the MI6 officer in Turkey. Between them, they obtain the Lektor, and the three escape with the device on the Orient Express. However, they are followed by Grant, who kills Kerim Bey and a Soviet security officer. Grant pretends to be another British agent and meets Bond. Over dinner Grant drugs Romanova, then overcomes Bond. Bond tricks Grant into opening Bond's attaché case in the manner that detonates its tear gas booby trap, allowing Bond to attack and kill him. Bond and Romanova escape with the Lektor to Venice. Rosa Klebb, disguised as a hotel maid, attempts to steal the Lektor and kill Bond, but ends up being shot by Romanova.

Goldfinger (1964) 

Bond is ordered to observe bullion dealer Auric Goldfinger. He suspects Goldfinger of cheating at cards and foils his scheme by distracting his female accomplice, who is later killed by Goldfinger's Korean manservant and henchman Oddjob after Bond seduces her. Bond is then instructed to investigate Goldfinger's gold smuggling operation and he tails the dealer to Switzerland. Bond is captured when he reconnoitres Goldfinger's plant and is drugged unconscious; Goldfinger then transports Bond to his Kentucky stud farm where he holds Bond captive. Bond escapes briefly to witness Goldfinger's meeting with US mafiosi, observing secretly as Goldfinger presents to the gangsters his plans to rob Fort Knox by using materials they have smuggled to him and later kills them to avoid paying his dues.

Bond is recaptured after hearing the details of the operation, but he subsequently seduces Pussy Galore, Goldfinger's private pilot, and convinces her to inform the American authorities. Goldfinger's private army breaks into Fort Knox and accesses the vault, where Bond fights and kills Oddjob, while American troops battle with Goldfinger's army outside. Bond's plane is hijacked by Goldfinger, but Bond struggles with him and shoots out a window, creating an explosive decompression, killing Goldfinger.

Thunderball (1965) 

Bond investigates the hijacking of an Avro Vulcan loaded with two atomic bombs, which had been taken by SPECTRE. The organisation demands a ransom for the return of the bombs. Bond follows a lead to the Bahamas, where he meets up with his CIA counterpart and friend Felix Leiter. The pair suspect a rich playboy, Emilio Largo, who is soon discovered to be SPECTRE's Number Two, ordered by the secretive Number One to direct the operation, and search the area around his yacht and then the area where they think the yacht may have travelled. After finding the plane—but without the nuclear devices on board—the two agents arrange for Largo's yacht to be tracked and ambushed once the bombs are being moved by Largo.

You Only Live Twice (1967) 

007 is sent to Japan to investigate the spacecraft theft and astronaut kidnapping in orbit of American Project Gemini spacecraft Jupiter 16 by an unidentified spacecraft. Upon his arrival, Bond is contacted by Aki, assistant to the Japanese secret service leader Tiger Tanaka. Bond established that the mastermind behind the hijacking is SPECTRE's Number One, Ernst Stavro Blofeld, in conjunction with Osato, a local industrialist. Bond follows the trail to Blofeld's island headquarters and spaceport, while the spacecraft, Bird One, attacks a Soviet capsule. Blofeld explains to Bond that his plot is to fake in front of each superpower that Bird One is an enemy spacecraft to transform the Cold War into World War III.

Tanaka's ninja troops attack the island, while Bond manages to distract Blofeld and create a diversion which allows him to open the hatch, letting in the ninjas. During the battle, Osato is killed by Blofeld, who activates the base's self-destruct system and escapes. Bond, Kissy, Tanaka and the surviving ninjas escape through the cave tunnel before it explodes, and are rescued by submarine.

On Her Majesty's Secret Service (1969) 

While searching for Blofeld, the head of SPECTRE, Bond (played by George Lazenby) saves Tracy di Vicenzo (Diana Rigg) on the beach from committing suicide by drowning, and later meets her again in a casino. Bond then receives information from Marc-Ange Draco, the head of the European crime syndicate Unione Corse and Tracy's father, about Blofeld's Swiss solicitor. Bond breaks into the solicitor's office and establishes Blofeld is corresponding with the London College of Arms. Posing as an emissary of the college, Bond meets Blofeld, who has established a clinical allergy-research institute atop Piz Gloria in the Swiss Alps. Bond soon establishes that Blofeld is brainwashing his patients to distribute bacteriological warfare agents throughout various parts of the world.

Bond escapes from the clinic after Blofeld identifies him as a British agent. Bond arranges a raid on the clinic using men from Draco's organisation. The raid is a success, although Blofeld escapes. Bond marries Tracy, but she is murdered shortly afterwards by Irma Bunt, Blofeld's partner.

Diamonds Are Forever (1971) 

Bond is tasked with investigating a major diamond smuggling ring which begins in Africa and runs through Holland and the UK to the United States. Disguised as professional smuggler and murderer Peter Franks, Bond travels to Amsterdam to meet contact Tiffany Case: he is given the diamonds and travels on to the US, where he is met by Felix Leiter. Bond moves through the chain, which leads to the Whyte House, a casino-hotel owned by the reclusive billionaire Willard Whyte.

Bond follows the diamonds to a pick-up by Bert Saxby, Whyte's head of security, and then onto a research laboratory owned by Whyte, where he finds that a satellite is being built by a laser refraction specialist, Professor Dr. Metz. Suspecting Whyte, Bond tries to confront him, but instead meets Blofeld, who captures the agent and explains to him that the satellite can blow up nuclear missiles. Blofeld admits that he intends to auction it to the highest bidder. Bond escapes and frees the captive Whyte and they establish that Blofeld is using an offshore oil rig as his base. Bond attacks the rig, stopping Blofeld's operation and dispersing his organisation.

Live and Let Die (1973) 

James Bond is sent to investigate the murder of three British MI6 agents, all of whom have been killed within 24 hours. The victims were all separately investigating the operations of Dr. Kananga, the dictator of a small Caribbean island, San Monique. Bond discovers that Kananga also acts as Mr. Big, a ruthless and cunning American gangster.

Upon visiting San Monique, Bond determines that Kananga is producing two tons of heroin and is protecting the poppy fields by exploiting locals' fear of voodoo and the occult. Through his alter ego, Mr. Big, Kananga plans to distribute the heroin free of charge at his Fillet of Soul restaurants, which will increase the number of addicts. Bond is captured by Kananga, but he escapes, killing Kananga and destroying the poppy crop.

The Man with the Golden Gun (1974) 

After receiving a golden bullet with James Bond's code "007" etched into its surface M relieves Bond of a mission locating a British scientist, Gibson, who has invented the "Solex agitator", a device to harness solar power, thereby solving the energy crisis. The bullet signifies Bond is a target of assassin Francisco Scaramanga and Bond sets out unofficially to find him. From a spent golden bullet, Bond tracks Scaramanga to Macau, where he sees Scaramanga's mistress collecting golden bullets at a casino. Bond follows her to Hong Kong, where he witnesses the murder of Gibson and the theft of the Solex agitator. Bond is subsequently assigned to retrieve the agitator and assassinate Scaramanga.

Bond meets with Hai Fat, a wealthy Thai entrepreneur suspected of arranging Gibson's murder, and is captured, but subsequently escapes. He tracks Scaramanga to an island in Red Chinese waters, where the two men fight and Bond kills the assassin.

The Spy Who Loved Me (1977) 

Bond is tasked with investigating the disappearance of British and Soviet ballistic missile submarines and the subsequent offer to sell a submarine tracking system. Bond works alongside Major Anya Amasova of the KGB. The pair track the plans across Egypt and identify the person responsible for the thefts as shipping tycoon, scientist and anarchist Karl Stromberg.

Bond and Amasova follow a suspicious tanker owned by Stromberg and establish it is responsible for the missing submarines; the submarine in which they are travelling is also captured by Stromberg. Stromberg plans to destroy Moscow and New York, triggering nuclear war, and to then establish a new civilisation. Bond escapes, freeing the submariners captured from the other submarines, and follows Stromberg to his headquarters, where he shoots the tycoon and a torpedo destroys the base.

Moonraker (1979) 

A Drax Industries Moonraker space shuttle on loan is hijacked and Bond is ordered to investigate. Bond meets the owner of the company, Hugo Drax and one of Drax's scientists, Dr. Holly Goodhead. Bond follows the trail to Venice, where he establishes that Drax is manufacturing a nerve gas deadly to humans, but harmless to animals. Bond again meets Goodhead and finds out that she is a CIA agent.

Bond travels to the Amazon looking for Drax's research facility, where he is captured. He and Goodhead pose as pilots on one of six space shuttles being sent by Drax to a hidden space station. There Bond finds out that Drax plans to destroy all human life by launching fifty globes containing the toxin into the Earth's atmosphere. Bond and Goodhead disable the radar jammer hiding the station from Earth and the US sends a platoon of Marines in a military space shuttle. During the battle, Bond kills Drax and his station is destroyed.

For Your Eyes Only (1981) 

After a British spy boat sinks, a marine archaeologist, Sir Timothy Havelock, is tasked to retrieve its Automatic Targeting Attack Communicator (ATAC) communication system before the Russians do. After Havelock is murdered by Gonzales, a Cuban hit-man, Bond is ordered to find out who hired Gonzales. While investigating, Bond is captured, but Gonzales is subsequently killed by Havelock's daughter Melina, and she and Bond escape. Bond identifies one of those present with Gonzales as Emile Leopold Locque and so follows a lead to Italy and meets his contact, Luigi Ferrara, and a well-connected Greek businessman and intelligence informant, Aris Kristatos. Kristatos tells Bond that Locque is employed by Milos Columbo, Kristatos' former organised crime partner.

After Ferrara is murdered—and the evidence points to Columbo—Bond is captured by men working for Columbo. Columbo then explains that Locque was actually hired by Kristatos, who is working for the KGB to retrieve the ATAC. Bond and Melina recover the ATAC but are captured by Kristatos. They escape and follow Kristatos to Greece, where he is killed and the ATAC is destroyed by Bond.

Octopussy (1983) 

Bond investigates the murder of 009, killed in East Berlin while dressed as a circus clown and carrying a fake Fabergé egg. An identical egg appears at auction and Bond establishes the buyer, exiled Afghan prince Kamal Khan, is working with Orlov, a renegade Soviet general, who is seeking to expand Soviet borders into Europe. Bond meets Octopussy, a wealthy woman who leads the Octopus cult. Bond finds out that Orlov has been supplying Khan with priceless Soviet treasures, replacing them with replicas, while Khan has been smuggling the real versions into the West via Octopussy's circus troupe.

Bond infiltrates the circus and finds that Orlov replaced the Soviet treasures with a nuclear warhead primed to explode at a US Air Force base in West Germany. The explosion would trigger Europe into seeking disarmament, in the belief that the bomb was an American one that was detonated by accident, leaving the West's borders open to Soviet invasion. Bond deactivates the warhead and then he returns to India, joining an assault on Khan's palace.

A View to a Kill (1985) 

Bond investigates millionaire industrialist Max Zorin, who is trying to corner the world market in microchips. He establishes that Zorin was previously trained and financed by the KGB, but has now gone rogue. Zorin unveils to a group of investors his plan to destroy Silicon Valley, which will give him a monopoly in the manufacturing of microchips.

Bond uncovers Zorin's plan is to detonate explosives beneath the lakes along the Hayward and San Andreas faults, which will cause them to flood. A larger bomb in a mine will destroy a "geological lock" that prevents the two faults from moving at the same time. Bond destroys the bomb, and subsequently kills Zorin.

The Living Daylights (1987) 

Bond aids the defection of KGB officer General Georgi Koskov, by wounding a female KGB sniper, Kara Milovy, a cellist. During his debriefing Koskov alleges that the KGB's old policy of Smiert Spionam, meaning Death to Spies, has been revived by General Leonid Pushkin, its new head. Koskov is subsequently abducted from the safe-house and Bond is ordered to kill Pushkin.

Bond tracks down Milovy and establishes she is Koskov's girlfriend and that the defection was staged. He subsequently finds out that Koskov is a friend of the arms dealer Brad Whitaker. After meeting Pushkin and faking his assassination, Bond investigates a scheme by Koskov and Whitaker to embezzle KGB funds and use them to purchase diamonds, which they then use to purchase drugs. After Koskov purchases the drugs, Bond destroys them. Koskov is subsequently arrested by Pushkin, while Bond kills Whitaker.

Licence to Kill (1989) 

Bond aids Felix Leiter in the capture of drugs lord Franz Sanchez; Sanchez escapes and maims Leiter, while also killing his wife. Bond swears revenge, but is ordered to return to duty by M. Bond refuses, and M revokes his licence to kill, causing Bond to become a rogue agent; although officially stripped of his status, he is unofficially given help by Q.

Bond journeys to Sanchez's home in the Republic of Isthmus and is taken-on to Sanchez's staff, where he manages to raise Sanchez's suspicions against a number of his employees. When Bond is taken to Sanchez's main base and drugs refinery, he is recognised by one of Sanchez's men and captured. He escapes, destroying the refinery in the process, and pursues Sanchez, killing him.

GoldenEye (1995) 

In 1986 Bond and Alec Trevelyan—agent 006—infiltrate an illicit Soviet chemical weapons facility and plant explosive charges. Trevelyan is shot, but Bond escapes from the facility as it explodes. Nine years later, Bond witnesses the theft by criminal organisation Janus of a prototype Eurocopter Tiger helicopter that can withstand an electromagnetic pulse. Janus uses the helicopter to steal the control disk for the dual GoldenEye satellite weapons, using the GoldenEye to destroy the complex with an electromagnetic pulse; there are two survivors of the attack, the programmers Natalya Simonova and Boris Grishenko.

Bond investigates the attack and travels to Russia where he locates Simonova and learns that Trevelyan, who had faked his own death, was the head of Janus. Simonova tracks computer traffic to Cuba and she and Bond travel there and locate Trevelyan, who reveals his plan to steal money from the Bank of England before erasing all of its financial records with the GoldenEye, concealing the theft and destroying Britain's economy. Bond and Simonova destroy the satellite facility, killing Trevelyan and Grishenko in the process.

Tomorrow Never Dies (1997) 

Bond investigates the sinking of a British warship in Chinese waters, the theft of one of the ship's cruise missiles, and the shooting down of a Chinese fighter plane. He uncovers a link to media mogul Elliot Carver which suggests that Carver had purchased a GPS encoder on the black market.

Bond encounters Chinese agent Wai Lin, who is also investigating the matter, and the two agree to work together. They discover that Carver had used the GPS encoder to push the British ship off course and into Chinese waters to incite a war for ratings. With the British fleet on their way to China, Bond and Wai Lin find Carver's stealth ship, board it and prevent the firing of a British cruise missile at Beijing. They blow a hole in the ship, exposing it to radar, leading to its sinking and thus averting war between Britain and China.

The World Is Not Enough (1999) 

Bond recovers money for Sir Robert King, a British oil tycoon and friend of M, but the money is booby-trapped and kills King shortly afterwards. Bond traces the money to Renard, a KGB agent-turned-terrorist, who had previously kidnapped King's daughter Elektra. MI6 believes that Renard is targeting Elektra King a second time and Bond is assigned to protect her; the pair are subsequently attacked.

Bond visits Valentin Zukovsky and is informed that Elektra's head of security, Davidov, is in league with Renard: Bond kills Davidov and follows the trail to a Russian ICBM base in Kazakhstan. Posing as a Russian nuclear scientist, Bond meets American nuclear physicist Christmas Jones. The two witness Renard stealing the GPS locator card and a half quantity of weapons-grade plutonium from a bomb and set off an explosion, from which Bond and Jones escape. Elektra kidnaps M after she thinks Bond had been killed and Bond establishes that Elektra intends to create a nuclear explosion in a submarine in Istanbul to increase the value of her own oil pipeline. Bond frees M, kills Elektra and then disarms the bomb on the submarine, where he kills Renard.

Die Another Day (2002) 

Bond investigates North Korean Colonel Tan-Sun Moon, who is illegally trading African conflict diamonds for weapons. Moon is apparently killed and Bond is captured and tortured for 14 months, after which he is exchanged for Zao, Moon's assistant. Despite being suspended on his return, he decides to complete his mission and tracks down Zao to a gene therapy clinic, where patients can have their appearances altered through DNA restructuring. Zao escapes, but the trail leads to British billionaire Gustav Graves.

Graves unveils a mirror satellite, "Icarus", which is able to focus solar energy on a small area and provide year-round sunshine for crop development. Bond discovers that Moon has also undergone the gene therapy and has assumed the identity of Graves. Bond then exposes Moon's plan: to use the Icarus as a sun gun to cut a path through the Korean Demilitarized Zone with concentrated sunlight, allowing North Korean troops to invade South Korea and reunite the countries through force. Bond disables the Icarus controls, kills Moon and stops the invasion.

Casino Royale (2006) 

This serves as a reboot of the series, with Bond gaining his 00 status in the pre-credits sequence. Bond tracks down and kills a bomb-maker and takes his mobile phone. Searching through the phone, Bond discovers a text message which he traces to Alex Dimitrios, and then on to terrorist financier Le Chiffre, who short-sells stock in successful companies and then engineering terrorist attacks to sink their share prices. Bond foils Le Chiffre's plan to destroy the prototype Skyfleet airliner, which forces Le Chiffre to set up a high-stakes poker tournament at the Casino Royale to recoup his fortune. Bond is instructed to beat Le Chiffre and is aided by a member of HM Treasury, Vesper Lynd.

Bond beats Le Chiffre at the poker table, but Lynd is kidnapped by Le Chiffre after the game, as is Bond, who is captured while pursuing them; Lynd is ransomed for the money and Bond is tortured. Le Chiffre is subsequently killed by Mr. White, a liaison between Le Chiffre and a number of his clients. Bond learns that his poker winnings were never repaid to the Treasury, which Lynd was supposed to have done, and establishes that she was a double agent. Bond pursues her and is attacked by members of White's organisation: he survives, but White takes the money and Lynd sacrifices herself to save Bond, as he later finds out from M. Bond subsequently finds and captures White.

Quantum of Solace (2008) 

Along with M, Bond interrogates Mr. White regarding his organisation, Quantum. M's bodyguard, Mitchell, a double agent, attacks M, enabling White to escape. Bond traces the organisation to Haiti and a connection to environmentalist Dominic Greene.

Bond uncovers a plot between Greene and an exiled Bolivian General, Medrano, to put Medrano in power in Bolivia while Quantum is given a monopoly to run the water supply to the country. Bond ascertains that Quantum is damming Bolivia's supply of fresh water to force the price up. With help from Bolivian secret agent Camille Montes, Bond attacks the hotel where Greene and Medrano are finalising their plans and leaves Greene stranded in the desert with only a tin of engine oil to drink. Bond then finds Vesper's former lover and member of Quantum, Yusef Kabira, bringing him to justice.

Skyfall (2012) 

After an operation in Istanbul ends in disaster, Bond is missing and presumed to be dead. In the aftermath, questions are raised over M's ability to run the Secret Service, and she becomes the subject of a government review over her handling of the situation. The Service itself is attacked, prompting Bond's return to London. His presence assists MI6's investigation in uncovering a lead, and Bond is sent to Shanghai and Macau in pursuit of a mercenary named Patrice. There, he establishes a connection to Raoul Silva, a former MI6 agent who was captured and tortured by Chinese agents. Blaming M for his imprisonment, Silva sets in motion a plan to ruin her reputation before murdering her. Bond saves M and attempts to lure Silva into a trap, and while he is successful in repelling Silva's assault, M is killed. Bond returns to active duty under the command of the new M, Gareth Mallory.

Spectre (2015) 

Following her death in Skyfall, M sends Bond a posthumous message that leads him to thwart a terrorist attack in Mexico City. Gareth Mallory takes Bond off active duty for his illegal operation, but Bond continues his investigation off the books. The trail leads him first to Rome, where he learns of a sinister terrorist organisation known as Spectre, and later to Austria. There he finds former adversary Mr. White, who has become terminally ill after being poisoned by Spectre. White asks Bond to protect his daughter Madeleine Swann from Spectre and its leader, Franz Oberhauser, before committing suicide.

Meanwhile, Mallory comes under pressure to have British intelligence join a global intelligence-sharing network code-named "Nine Eyes". With Swann's help, Bond tracks Spectre to Morocco and learns that Spectre is behind the terror attacks, creating a need for Nine Eyes. Spectre controls Nine Eyes, giving them access to the intelligence-sharing network. Oberhauser captures and tortures Bond, revealing that his father was Bond's guardian after the deaths of Bond's parents. Jealous of the attention and care that his father gave to the young James Bond, Oberhauser faked his own death while at the same time murdering his own father. Now known as Ernst Stavro Blofeld, he claims responsibility for everything Bond has suffered in his career. Bond and Swann escape and return to London where Bond joins forces with Mallory and Q to shut down Nine Eyes and apprehend Blofeld.

No Time to Die (2021) 

Five years after Blofeld's imprisonment, Bond is retired and living in Jamaica when Felix Leiter and his colleague Logan Ash enlist his help in searching for the missing MI6 scientist, Valdo Obruchev. Bond eventually accepts Leiter's request and follows his leads about the scientist's whereabouts to Cuba, where he infiltrates a Spectre gathering. Obruchev realises that it is a trap set by Blofeld to kill Bond with a deadly virus, but he is working for someone else and has re-engineered the virus to attack only the members of Spectre. When Bond brings Obruchev to Leiter, Ash betrays them and helps Obruchev escape, killing Leiter. Bond returns to MI6 and confronts M regarding the virus, known as "Heracles," a nanoscale weapon that can be programmed to attack specific people based on their genetic marker. He then visits Blofeld in prison and is reacquainted with Madeleine Swann. Swann decides to leave before Blofeld arrives, while Bond has an altercation with Blofeld, who dies soon after. It is revealed that when he touched Swann, Bond was infected with Heracles nanobots that were programmed to kill Blofeld.

Bond traces Swann back to her childhood home where she is living with her five-year-old daughter, Mathilde. She tells Bond about Lyutsifer Safin, the man who controls Heracles. After Bond avenges Leiter's death by killing Ash, Safin captures Swann and Mathilde and brings them to his island, which is the Heracles factory. Bond works with MI6 to rescue Swann and Mathilde and destroy Safin's factory with a missile strike launched from a nearby Royal Navy destroyer. Before Bond kills him, Safin infects Bond with nanobots that have been programmed to attack Swann and Mathilde. Because of this, Bond decides to sacrifice himself to save them. After a tearful goodbye to Swann, who confirms that Mathilde is in fact his daughter, Bond is killed when the missiles obliterate the factory.

Non-Eon films 
The two Bond films from other production companies have a combined gross of over $200 million (or approximately $871 million in 2020 dollars)

Casino Royale (1967) 

Bond is brought out of retirement to deal with SMERSH and is promoted to the head of MI6 on the death of M. He recruits baccarat player Evelyn Tremble to beat SMERSH agent Le Chiffre. Having embezzled SMERSH's money, Le Chiffre is desperate for money to cover up his theft. Tremble stops Le Chiffre's cheating and beats him in a game of baccarat. Tremble is captured, tortured and killed. Bond establishes that the casino is located atop a giant underground headquarters run by the evil Dr. Noah; he and Moneypenny travel there to investigate. Dr. Noah turns out to be Sir James's nephew Jimmy Bond, who plans to use biological warfare to make all women beautiful and kill all tall men, leaving him as the "big man" who gets all the girls. The casino is then overrun by secret agents and a battle ensues, but the building explodes, killing all inside.

Never Say Never Again (1983) 

Bond investigates the hijacking of two cruise missiles with live nuclear warheads which had been taken by SPECTRE. He meets Domino Petachi, the pilot's sister, and her lover, Maximillian Largo, SPECTRE's Number One, who reports directly to Blofeld. Following them to France, Bond informs Domino of her brother's death and subsequently finds his MI6 colleague killed by Fatima Blush, another SPECTRE agent: Bond kills her. Bond and Felix Leiter then attempt to board Largo's motor yacht, the Disco Volante (Flying Saucer), in search of the missing nuclear warheads. Bond becomes trapped and is taken, with Domino, to Palmyra, Largo's base of operations in North Africa, but Bond subsequently escapes with Domino. The two agents ambush Largo while he is placing one of the bombs.

Critical and public reception

Awards
In their sixty-year history, the Bond films have been nominated for and won many awards, including British Academy Film Awards, Golden Globe Awards and Academy Awards. In 1982, series originator Albert R. Broccoli also received the Irving G. Thalberg Memorial Award.

See also 
 Bond girl
 "Casino Royale" (Climax!), the first live-action adaptation of an Ian Fleming novel
 James Bond music
 Outline of James Bond

References and sources

References

Sources 
 
 
 
 
 

James Bond